Maclaren Cemetery is a small cemetery in the town of Wakefield, Quebec and the final resting place for Prime Minister Lester B. Pearson. Established near the 1870s, the cemetery is located in the clearing below the hills bordering the Gatineau River and is the resting place for Scottish settlers in the area.

Notable persons interred here include:
 David Maclaren – settler and namesake of the cemetery 
 Malak Karsh (1915–2001) – Canadian photographer
 Ian Kerr (1965–2019) – law professor and privacy expert Ian Kerr (academic)

 Geoffrey Pearson (1927–2008) – diplomat and son of Lester B. Pearson
 Lester B. Pearson (1897–1972) – 14th Prime Minister of Canada and Nobel Peace Prize winner
 Norman Robertson (1904–1968) – diplomat and friend of Pearson and Wrong
 Humphrey Hume Wrong (1894–1954) – diplomat and friend of Pearson and Robertson

External links
 History of the Maclaren Family
 

Cemeteries in Quebec
Cemeteries established in the 1870s
1870s establishments in Quebec